The Halifax Thunderbirds are a professional box lacrosse team based in Halifax, Nova Scotia, playing in the National Lacrosse League (NLL) as a member of the East Division. The team plays their home games at the Scotiabank Centre which they share with the Halifax Mooseheads of the Quebec Major Junior Hockey League.

History
On September 13, 2018, the NLL approved a franchise relocation to the city of Halifax.  Curt Styres, the previous owner of the NLL's Rochester Knighthawks, moved the Knighthawks' franchise to Halifax, Nova Scotia. The Knighthawks intellectual property (name and logo) was sold to Pegula Sports and Entertainment, owners of the Buffalo Bandits, which founded a new expansion franchise that started play in the 2019–2020 season under the Knighthawks moniker. While located in Rochester the franchise won 5 championships. 

The Halifax Thunderbirds made their league debut on December 7, 2019, defeating the New York Riptide 12–4 in front of a crowd of 6,847 at the Scotiabank Centre. 

The Thunderbirds made their first playoffs in the 2022 season but were defeated in the first round in overtime 14–13 by their rival, the Toronto Rock.

Team name and logo 
According to the Toronto Star, Curt Styres got the idea for the team's name when he saw a lacrosse stick made from the wood of tree that had been struck by lightning and wanted to reflect the "one in one thousand odds" that was the lacrosse stick's embodiement.

Previous location 

The Rochester Knighthawks were founded in 1995 during the Major Indoor Lacrosse League era and played their home games at Blue Cross Arena in Rochester, New York.  The team made the playoffs their first 13 seasons in a row and won 5 championships between 1997 and 2014. In 2018 after losing to the Saskatchewan Rush in the NLL finals, it was announced the Knighthawks would move to Halifax, Nova Scotia. Knighthawks owner, Curt Styres sold the team's name and logo to Terry and Kim Pegula (Owners of Pegula Sports and Entertainment) and relocated the franchise to Halifax. PSE founded a new expansion franchise with the same name but different logo that started play the following season. The new Knighthawks franchise is not a continuation of original franchise as all of the original team's championships and records were transferred to Halifax as part of the relocation.

Current roster

Awards and honors

All-time record

Playoff results

Draft history

NLL Entry Draft 
First Round Selections

 2019: Clarke Petterson (5th overall), Trevor Smyth (14th overall) 
 2020: Ethan Riggs (11th overall)
 2021: Max Wilson (12th overall)
 2022: Wake:Riat "Bo" Bowhunter (12th overall)

References

External links
 Official Website

2018 establishments in Nova Scotia
Halifax Thunderbirds
Lacrosse clubs established in 2018
National Lacrosse League teams
Sport in Halifax, Nova Scotia